This page includes a list of satellite buses, of which multiple similar artificial satellites have been, or are being, built to the same model of structural frame, propulsion, spacecraft power and intra-spacecraft communication. Only commercially available (in present or past) buses are included, thus excluding series-produced proprietary satellites operated only by their makers.

Satellite buses

Legend for abbreviations in the table:

GEO – Geostationary orbit
GSO – Geosynchronous orbit
GTO – Geostationary transfer orbit
HCO – Heliocentric orbit
HEO – High Earth orbit
LEO – Low Earth orbit
MEO – Medium Earth orbit
SSO – Sun-synchronous orbit
TLI – Trans Lunar Injection

See also
 :Category:Satellite buses
 Launch vehicle
 Product model

References

Notes
It is not clear from the sources if the Spacebus 100 satellite bus is still on offer.

Comparisons
Space lists
Technological comparisons